Jack Harvey is the name of:

Jack Harvey (director) (1881–1954), American actor, director and screenwriter
Jack Harvey (VC) (1891–1940), English recipient of the Victoria Cross
Jack Harvey (politician) (1907–1986), American politician
Jack Harvey (greyhound trainer) (1907-1996), English greyhound trainer
Jack Harvey (basketball) (1918–1981), American basketball player
Jack Harvey, pen name of Ian Rankin (born 1960), Scottish novelist
Jack Harvey (racing driver) (born 1993), British racing driver

See also 
John Harvey (disambiguation)